Keratin 1 is a Type II intermediate filament (IFs) of the intracytoplasmatic cytoskeleton. Is co-expressed with and binds to Keratin 10, a Type I keratin, to form a coiled coil heterotypic keratin chain. Keratin 1 and Keratin 10 are specifically expressed in the spinous and granular layers of the epidermis. In contrast, basal layer keratinocytes express little to no Keratin 1. Mutations in KRT1, the gene encoding Keratin 1, have been associated with variants of the disease bullous congenital ichthyosiform erythroderma in which the palms and soles of the feet are affected. Mutations in KRT10 have also been associated with bullous congenital ichthyosiform erythroderma; however, in patients with KRT10 mutations the palms and soles are spared. This difference is likely due to Keratin 9, rather than Keratin 10, being the major binding partner of Keratin 1 in acral (palm and sole) keratinocytes.

Type II cytokeratins are clustered in a region of chromosome 12q12-q13.

Interactions 

Keratin 1 has been shown to interact with Desmoplakin and PRKCE.

See also 
34βE12

References

Further reading 

 
 
 
 
 
 
 
 
 
 
 
 
 
 
 
 
 
 
 
 

Keratins